Chaudhary Munawwar Hasan (15 May 1964 – 10 December 2008) was an MP and political activist
during Mulayam Singh Yadav's Government between 2003 and 2007.

Personal life
Munawwar was born in a Gujjar family, has four brothers, was married to Begum Tabassum Hasan, and had one son (Nahid Hasan) and one daughter (Iqra Hassan).

Political life
Munawwar was elected to the State Legislative assembly from Kairana Assembly constituency in 1991 and 1993 by defeating Hukum Singh. Hasan then elected to Lok Sabha in 1996 on a Samajwadi Party ticket. He was again elected on a Samajwadi Party ticket from Muzaffarnagar in Uttar Pradesh in 2004, but rebelled at the time of 22 July trust vote. He was expelled by the Samajwadi Party, which also filed a petition seeking his disqualification from the House. The petition was pending with the Lok Sabha Speaker. He later joined the Bahujan Samaj Party. SP chief Mulayam Singh Yadav send Hasan to Rajya Sabha in 1998 after he lost lok sabha election from Virendra Verma

Death
He was killed in a road accident near Palwal in the state of Haryana.

Positions held

Elections contested

References

External links
 Official biographical sketch in Parliament of India website

1964 births
2008 deaths
Indian Muslims
Road incident deaths in India
People from Muzaffarnagar district
India MPs 2004–2009
Janata Dal politicians
Samajwadi Party politicians
Lok Sabha members from Uttar Pradesh
India MPs 1996–1997
Uttar Pradesh MLAs 1991–1993
Uttar Pradesh MLAs 1993–1996
Bahujan Samaj Party politicians from Uttar Pradesh